The following is a list of cities and towns that have historically had official or local names in the German language. Commonly, these cities have at times been under the control of the Austro-Hungarian Empire or Germany or German nation-states. This is the main reason for German city exonyms. Also, many of these are obsolete, archaic or very rare in modern usage, mainly due to their association with the policies of the German Empire and the Nazis.

References